Jakubów  is a village in Mińsk County, Masovian Voivodeship, in east-central Poland. It is the seat of the gmina (administrative district) called Gmina Jakubów.

References

Villages in Mińsk County